Mithamoin is an upazila (subdistrict) of Kishoreganj District in northern Bangladesh, located in the Dhaka Division. It is best known as the home upazila of Abdul Hamid, the current President of Bangladesh.

Geography
Mithamoin has 17,183 households and a total land area of 222.92 km2.

History
The area has been inhabited for centuries. The name of Mithamain can be found in James Rennell's 1781 map of Bengal. The upazila was named after the village of Mithamain. Its etymology is rumored to be that at one time there was a large reed forest in the vicinity of the area. The reed was sweet, and the name of the village came to Mithabon (মিঠাবন sweet forest) which was corrupted to Mithamon and later Mithamain/Mithamoin in the local dialect.

During the Bangladesh Liberation War of 1971, 28 Bengalis were murdered in the village of Dhubajura and 3 in Telikhai on 1 November. Boira was a site of mass killing. On 7 November 1983, Mithamain Thana was upgraded to an upazila.

Demographics
As of the 1991 Bangladesh census, Mithamoin's population is 108,204. The population's male to female ratio is 51.79% to 48.21%. 49,034 of Upazila's population is aged 18 or above. Mithamoin has an average literacy rate of 15.6% (7+ years). The literary rate nationally is 32.4%.

Administration
Mithamoin Upazila is divided into Mithamoin Municipality and seven union parishads: Bairati, Dhaki, Ghagra, Gopedighi, Khatkhal, Keorjori, and Mithamain. The union parishads are subdivided into 59 mauzas and 135 villages.

Chairmen

Notable people
Abdul Hamid, longest serving President of Bangladesh
Rejwan Ahammad Taufiq, politician

See also
Upazilas of Bangladesh
Districts of Bangladesh
Divisions of Bangladesh

References

Upazilas of Kishoreganj District